Bulgarica denticulata is a species of small air-breathing land snails, a terrestrial pulmonate gastropod mollusk in the family Clausiliidae, the door snails, all of which have a clausilium.

Distribution 
This species lives in Turkey.

References

Clausiliidae
Gastropods described in 1801